India Square, also known as "Little India," is a commercial and restaurant district in the Journal Square and Marion Section neighborhoods of Jersey City, New Jersey. The area is home to the highest concentration of Indian Americans in the Western Hemisphere, and is a rapidly growing Indian New Yorker ethnic enclave within the New York Metropolitan Area. The neighborhood is  centered on Newark Avenue, between Tonnele Avenue and JFK Boulevard, and is considered to be part of the larger Journal Square District. This area has been home to the largest outdoor Navratri festivities in New Jersey as well as several Hindu temples. This portion of Newark Avenue is lined with grocery stores including Patel Brothers and Subzi Mandi Cash & Carry, electronics vendors, video stores, clothing stores, and restaurants, and is one of the busiest pedestrian areas of this part of the city, often stopping traffic for hours.  According to the 2000 census, there were nearly 13,000 Indians living in this two-block stretch in Jersey City, up from 3,000 in 1980, increasing commensurately between 2000 and 2010. As of the 2010 Census, over 27,000 Asian Indians accounted for 10.9% of Jersey City's population, the highest proportion of any major U.S. city. After dark, the businesses light flashing signs and the street crowds continue.

An annual, color-filled spring Holi festival has taken place in Jersey City since 1992, centered upon India Square and attracting significant participation and international media attention. Although India Square continues to represent the heart of Little India in Jersey City, situated between Tonnele Avenue and John F. Kennedy Boulevard, Little India itself as of 2019 has been expanding further eastward along Newark Avenue, through Jersey City's Little Manila, to Summit Avenue and the Five Corners neighborhood.

See also

 Indian people
 Indians in the New York City metropolitan area
 Little India, Edison/Iselin, also known as Oak Tree Road, the largest and most diverse South Asian ethnic enclave and cultural hub in the United States
 Overseas Indians

Other named ethnic enclaves in  Northeastern New Jersey include:
Five Corners, a Filipino enclave in Jersey City
Havana on the Hudson, a Hispanic district in Jersey City
Ironbound, a Portuguese and Brazilian enclave in Newark
Koreatown, Fort Lee, a Korean enclave in southeast Bergen County
Koreatown, Palisades Park, also a Korean enclave in southeast Bergen County
Little Istanbul, also known as Little Ramallah, a Middle Eastern enclave in Paterson
Little Lima, a Peruvian enclave in Paterson

References

External links
Little India in Jersey City
Fahim, Kareem. "For Some Moviegoers, It’s ‘Hooray for Bollywood’" The New York Times. January 3, 2007.

Asian-American culture in New Jersey
Streets in Hudson County, New Jersey
Neighborhoods in Jersey City, New Jersey
Indian-American culture
Little Indias
Ethnic enclaves in New Jersey
Ethnic enclaves in the United States
Culture of Jersey City, New Jersey
Tourist attractions in Jersey City, New Jersey
Indian-American culture in New Jersey
Squares in Jersey City, New Jersey